Munsons is an unincorporated community in Jefferson County, in the U.S. state of Missouri.

The community has the name of one Judge Munson, a pioneer citizen.

References

Unincorporated communities in Jefferson County, Missouri
Unincorporated communities in Missouri